Rock Master is an international climbing competition held every year in Arco, Italy.  The event takes place in two rounds: the first is an on-sight session and the second is called "after work". The final classification is given by the sum of the two events. On Friday the athletes are given a chance to survey the work route, and the actual climbing takes place on Saturday and Sunday.  At the competition, two prestigious awards, known as the "Oscars of climbing", are presented: the Salewa Rock Award, and the La Sportiva Competition Award.

History
In 1985 it was disputed for the first time Sportroccia to Bardonecchia. The following year the event was tied to a stop at the side of the Colodri of Arc. Right on the wall of the Colodri in 1987, played in the first Rock Master. The following year, the race left the rock and from that moment is played only on artificial in a large open space at the base of Colodri.  Since 1999, in addition to lead climbing, bouldering and speed climbing competitions were also held.

Since 2006, during of the event, a jury give out the "Arco Rock Legends", two awards that are considered the Oscars of climbing:
Salewa Rock Award with the athlete had the best performance of single pitch sport climbs and boulder.
La Sportiva Competition Award for the best athlete who has competed in the previous competition season.

Format
The competition is usually held the first weekend of September, with a few exceptions:
in 2010 has been brought forward to July as a pre-event of the World Championship of climbing that would take place in 2011. Instead of the usual two rounds (worked and view) a competition was held to only classical view in three rounds: qualifiers, semi-finals and finals.
in 2011 instead of the Rock Master was held in July at the Arco Climbing World Championship in 2011 . The title of the Rock Master was, however, given the evidence of the Duel, a competition demonstration that took place at the end of the World Championship and attended the first sixteen male and female athletes of the league lead.

In 2012 the speed test was valid also as the fourth leg of the World Cup speed climbing 2012.

Winners

Lead

Bouldering

Speed

Duel

Arco Rock Legends

References

Bibliography

External links
Official site

Climbing competitions